Breakaway Creek is a small inland town with a population of 50 as counted at the 2016 Census.

Reference List

Towns in Victoria (Australia)